Sorsogon Cultural Center for the Arts, also known as just the Sorsogon Cultural Center is a theater underconstruction in Sorsogon City, Philippines. It is regarded as the second national cultural center of the Philippines, with the first being the Cultural Center of the Philippines Complex in Manila.

Construction of the venue began on October 16, 2017. The facility has a total seating capacity is 515; 338 seats on ground floor and 177 seats on the mid-floor level.

References

Buildings and structures in Sorsogon
Cultural centers
Sorsogon City